Teemu Matias Aalto (born 30 March 1978) is a Finnish former professional ice hockey player. He played in the for Ilves in the Finnish Liiga.

Career statistics

Regular season and playoffs

References

External links 
 

1978 births
Living people
People from Kokkola
Finnish ice hockey defencemen
HPK players
Timrå IK players
SC Bern players
Tappara players
Linköping HC players
Lukko players
Sportspeople from Central Ostrobothnia
21st-century Finnish people